Walter Strickland (1598?–1671) was an English politician.

Walter Strickland may also refer to:
Walter Strickland, 9th Baronet (1851–1938), English translator and radical
Walter Strickland (14th century MP) for Westmorland
Walter Strickland (died 1569), MP for Westmorland
Walter Strickland (c.1623-71), MP for Thirsk 1661–71
Walter Strickland (architect) (1841–1915), Canadian architect
Walter G. Strickland (1850–1928), English art historian, bibliographer, and antiquary